Brandywine is an unincorporated community in Summit County, in the U.S. state of Ohio.

History
A variant name was Brandywine Mills. A post office called Brandywine Mills was established in 1825, and remained in operation until 1855. The community took its name from nearby Brandywine Creek.

References

Unincorporated communities in Summit County, Ohio
Unincorporated communities in Ohio